Of One Blood is the second studio album by Shadows Fall, released on April 4, 2000. It was the band's first release on Century Media Records, featuring Brian Fair, and the last to feature drummer David Germain. 

A remastered version of the album, along with the band's 2001 Japanese EP Deadworld, was released under the title Fear Will Drag You Down in Europe and Australia, containing new and updated artwork. Metal Temple gave that version of the album a score of 7 out of 10.

Track listing

Personnel

Shadows Fall
 Brian Fair – lead vocals, lyrics on (2-4, 6, 8, & 10)
Jon Donais – lead guitar, backing vocals
Matt Bachand – rhythm guitar, clean vocals, lyrics on (4, 5, 7, & 9)
Paul Romanko – bass guitar
David Germain – drums

Other personnel

Lyricists 
Damien McPherson – on "Fleshold"
Phil Labonte – on "Revel in My Loss", & "To Ashes"

2008 reissue
 Zeuss – music on "Pain Glass Vision" Remix
 Remastered by Alan Douches
 Reissue coordinating by Steve Joh
 Photography by Jason Hellmann, Alex Solca, and Morgan Walker

Additional performer
 Ray Michaud – keyboards, music on "Pain Glass Vision"
Production
Produced, engineered, and mixed by Zeuss
Mastered by Keith Chirgwin and Morgan Walker
 Art direction, design, and layout by Tom Bejgrowicz
 A&R – Tom Bejgrowicz
 Photography by Jason Hellmann

Fear Will Drag You Down

Fear Will Drag You Down is a compilation album consisting of remastered versions from Of One Blood and their 2001 Japanese EP Deadworld. It was released in Europe and Australia.

Track listing

Tracks 13 and 14 were recorded live at 88.9 WERS studio on April 16, 2000, in Boston, Massachusetts
Track 15 was recorded live at CBGB on November 26, 2000, in New York City

Personnel
Shadows Fall
 Brian Fair – vocals
 Jonathan Donais – lead guitar, backing vocals
 Matt Bachand – guitar, backing vocals
 Paul Romanko – bass
 Derek Kerswill – drums (tracks 1–2)

Additional musicians
 David Germain – drums (tracks 3–15)

References

2000 albums
Shadows Fall albums
Century Media Records albums
Albums produced by Chris "Zeuss" Harris